Gəndov, Gyandov or Qandov may refer to:
 Gəndov, Davachi, Azerbaijan
 Gəndov, Ismailli, Azerbaijan
 Gəndov, Lerik, Azerbaijan